Epipsychidion is a major poetical work published in 1821 by Percy Bysshe Shelley. The work was subtitled: Verses addressed to the noble and unfortunate Lady Emilia V, now imprisoned in the convent of. The title is Greek for "concerning or about a little soul", from epi, "around", "about"; and psychidion, "little soul".

Background

Countess Teresa Viviani, the daughter of the governor of Pisa, was nineteen years old. Her father had placed her in the Convent of Saint Anna. Shelley had visited her several times and had corresponded with her briefly. After the work was published by Charles and James Ollier in London, Shelley requested them to withdraw it. One possible concern was that readers would interpret the poem biographically. Shelley referred to it as "an idealized history of my life and feelings". The poem contains autobiographical elements, consisting of 604 lines written for Viviani, whom Shelley met while she was "imprisoned" in 1820.

The theme of the work is a meditation on the nature of ideal love. Shelley advocates free love, criticising conventional marriage, which he described as "the weariest and the longest journey". Epipsychidion opens with an invocation to Emilia as a spiritual sister of the speaker. He addresses her as a "captive bird" for whose nest his poem will be soft rose petals. He calls her an angel of light, the light of the moon seen through mortal clouds, a star beyond all storms.

In a letter of 18 June 1822, Shelley described the work:

Epipsychidion was composed at Pisa, in January and February 1821, and was published anonymously in 1821 by Charles and James Ollier, London. The poem was included by Mary Shelley in the Poetical Works in 1839, both editions. The Bodleian Library has a first draft of Epipsychidion, "consisting of three versions, more or less complete, of the 'Preface [Advertisement]'; a version in ink and pencil, much cancelled, of the last eighty lines of the poem; and some additional lines which did not appear in print".

Shelley informed his publisher Charles Ollier that he wanted Epipsychidion to be circulated only to the sunetoi, the initiated, the cognoscenti, the enlightened, the "esoteric few".

References

Sources
Brown, Richard E. "The Role of Dante in Epipsychidion". Comparative Literature, Vol. 30, No. 3, Summer, 1978.
Cameron, Kenneth Neil. "The Planet-Tempest Passage in Epipsychidion." PMLA, 63 (1948), 950–72.
Goslee, Nancy Moore. "Dispersoning Emily: Drafting as Plot in Epipsychidion." Keats-Shelley Journal, Vol. 42, 1993.
Hughes, D.J. "Coherence and Collapse in Shelley, With Particular Reference to Epipsychidion." ELH, Vol. 28, No. 3, September 1961.
McConnell, Frank. "Shelleyan 'Allegory": Epipsychidion." Keats-Shelley Journal, Volume XX (1971), pp. 100–112.
McDayter, Ghislaine. "'O'er Leaping the Bounds': The Sexing of the Creative Soul in Shelley's Epipsychidion." Keats-Shelley Journal 52 (2003): 26.
Schulze, Earl. "The Dantean Quest of Epipsychidion." Studies in Romanticism, Vol. 21, No. 2, Summer, 1982.
Warren, Andrew. "'Unentangled Intermixture': Love and Materialism in Shelley's Epipsychidion." Keats-Shelley Journal, 2010.
Ulmer, William. Shelleyan Eros: The Rhetoric of Romantic Love. Princeton: Princeton University Press, 1990.
Pinch, Adela. "Romantic Passions: Thinking about the Other in Romantic Love". Romantic Circles. Praxis Series. Web link: http://www.rc.umd.edu/praxis/passions/pinch/pinch.html
O'Neill, Michael. "Shelley's Epipsychidion: The Before Unapprehended Relations of Things". Essays in Criticism, (1987) XXXVII (2): 135–157.
Jones, Frederick L. "Two Notes on Epipsychidion". Modern Language Notes, Vol. 50, No. 1 (January 1935), p. 40.
Lauritsen, John. “Hellenism and Homoeroticism in Shelley and his Circle”. The Journal of Homosexuality, Volume 49, Numbers 3/4, 2005.
Symonds, John Addington. Shelley. New Edition. English Men of Letters series, edited by John Morley. London: Macmillan, 1887. Originally published in 1878.
Vatalaro, Paul A. Shelley's Music: Fantasy, Authority, and the Object Voice. Farnham, Surrey, UK: Ashgate, 2009.
Verma, K.D. The Vision of "love's rare universe": A Study of Shelley's Epipsychidion. Lanham, MD: University Press of America, 1995.
Wroe, Ann. Being Shelley: The Poet's Search for Himself. Pantheon, 2007.

External links 

 Audiorecording of Epipsychidion on LibriVox, selection 45, read by Leonard Wilson.
 eNotes Study Guide for Epipsychidion.
 Online version of Epipsychidion.

1821 poems
Works about marriage
English poetry
Love poems
Works by Percy Bysshe Shelley
Poetry by Percy Bysshe Shelley